Majesty and Decay is Immolation's eighth full-length album, released March 9, 2010. It was recorded at New York's Millbrook Sound Studios and was produced by Paul Orofino and mixed by Zack Ohren.

Track listing

Personnel
Immolation
 Ross Dolan – bass, vocals
 Robert Vigna – guitars
 Bill Taylor – guitars
 Steve Shalaty – drums

Production
Pär Olofsson – artwork
Zack Ohren – mixing, mastering
Paul Orofino – engineering, tracking
Rob Kimura – layout
Brenden Flaherty – drum editing
Norman DelTufo – drum tuning

References

2010 albums
Immolation (band) albums
Nuclear Blast albums
Albums with cover art by Pär Olofsson